Sylvan Lake State Park is a Colorado state park located in Eagle County,  south of Eagle, Colorado. Facilities include a visitors center, boat ramp, campsites, cabins, yurts and picnic sites. Plant communities include aspen groves, lodgepole pine and Douglas fir forests on moist slopes. Ponderosa pine and juniper are found on drier slopes. Wetland and riparian areas exist near the reservoir and creek. Common wildlife includes black bear, elk, mule deer, pine marten and beaver.

References

State parks of Colorado
Protected areas of Eagle County, Colorado
Protected areas established in 1987
1987 establishments in Colorado